The Mark Christopher Charity Classic presented by County of San Bernardino was a golf tournament on the Nationwide Tour. It is played from 1994 to 2007. It was last played at Empire Lakes Golf Course in Rancho Cucamonga, California, United States.

The 2007 purse was $525,000, with $94,500 going to the winner.

Winners

Bolded golfers graduated to the PGA Tour via the final Nationwide Tour money list.

Notes

External links
PGATOUR.com tournament site

Former Korn Ferry Tour events
Golf in California
Recurring sporting events established in 1994
Recurring sporting events disestablished in 2007
1994 establishments in California
2007 disestablishments in California